Nisar Bazmi (1 December 1924 – 22 March 2007) was a composer and music director of Indian and Pakistan film industry.

Nisar Bazmi was known as one of the accomplished musician of South Asia. He also introduced new singers like Alamgir and Mehnaz Begum. The duo of composers Laxmikant–Pyarelal were musicians with Bazmi in India before partition. However, he is primarily remembered for his compositions in the voice of playback singer Ahmed Rushdi.

Early life and career
Syed Nisar Ahmed, was the son of Syed Qudrat Ali. He was born in 1924 in Jalgaon in Khandesh area of Maharashtra state, India. He did not belong to an artistic family. In fact, his family was extremely poor. He had to join Yasin Khan's Qawwali Group, a noted Qawwal in Mumbai at that time, as 'humnawa' (companion) at age 11. He possessed no prior musical background. In the late 1930s, a prominent Indian musician of Bombay, Khan Saheb Aman Ali Khan was convinced by Nisar Bazmi's musical interest and taught him music for four years. Equipped with artistic know-how, young Nisar Bazmi, who was just 13 at the time, quickly mastered the various ragas and the musical instruments. In 1939, the All India Radio hired him as an artist. In 1944, he composed some songs for a drama, "Nadir Shah Durrani", which was broadcast from the Bombay Radio Station. The songs were sung by Rafiq Ghaznavi and Amirbai Karnataki. After this initial success, Nisar Bazmi "started earning 50 rupees a month - a respectable salary in those days."

In India
Nisar Bazmi composed music for film "Jamana Paar", which was released in 1946. At this time, he also changed his name to Nisar Bazmi. He composed music for forty films in India. Twenty eight films were released during his stay in India. The rest of the movies were released in India after he emigrated to Pakistan.

In Pakistan
Nisar Bazmi came to visit his relatives in Pakistan in 1962. Here he met veteran film producer Fazal Ahmed Karim Fazli who invited him to compose music for Pakistani films. "Mr Bazmi accepted the offer and decided to settle in Pakistan."

His first song in Pakistan was "Mohabbat mei tere sar ki qasam" (singers, Ahmed Rushdi, Noor Jahan) for the 1964 film "Aisa bhi hota hai". He also composed many songs for Runa Laila, Ahmed Rushdi, Mehdi Hassan, Faisal Nadeem, Khursheed Nurali (Sheerazi), and Saleem Shahzaad. He had trained many of the modern composers. His closest student/assistant was Badar uz Zaman, the famous classical singer and composer, who remained associated with him for 18 years. Nisar Bazmi received many Nigar Awards for his achievements and composed music for 140 films in all during his career.

Music and super-hit film songs of Nisar Bazmi

 "Mohabbat Mein Tere Sar Ki Qasam Aisa Bhi Hua Hai" was his first big hit song in Pakistan.

Awards and recognition
Pride of Performance Award in 1994 by the President of Pakistan
Nigar Award - Nisar Bazmi won 'Best Music Director' award five times for different films

Death and legacy
Nisar Bazmi died on 22 March 2007 in Karachi.

A major Pakistani English-language newspaper commented after his death, "In the death of Nisar Bazmi, students of music in Pakistan have lost an opportunity to benefit from the experience of a virtuoso who scored 140 films in all."

"Nisar Bazmi was a thorough professional and a man of rare imagination. He used to study the storyline and the setting of a film before composing the music for a song."

References

External links
 
Nisar Bazmi Filmography on Complete Index To World Film (CITWF) website - Archived

1924 births
2007 deaths
Nigar Award winners
Indian emigrants to Pakistan
Pakistani film score composers
20th-century Pakistani male singers
People from Jalgaon
Recipients of the Pride of Performance
Musicians from Karachi
20th-century Indian male singers
20th-century Indian singers